Wii Play: Motion is a video game for the Wii console and the sequel to the 2006 game Wii Play. It was released in North America on June 13, 2011; Europe on June 24; and in Australia on June 30, 2011.

Unlike the original game, which was developed entirely by Nintendo, Wii Play: Motion'''s twelve minigames were developed by several different developers alongside Nintendo; these included Prope, Vanpool and Skip Ltd., among others. Similar to the original, all retail copies of Wii Play: Motion are bundled with a Wii Remote (red in Europe and black in other regions), though Motion came with the Wii Remote Plus variant. The game is the final Wii series game released on the Wii.

The game received mixed reviews from critics upon release, though it was generally considered to be superior to its predecessor.

Gameplay
Like its predecessor Wii Play, Wii Play: Motion is a minigame collection that features Miis as playable characters. All the minigames require use of the Wii MotionPlus accessory or Wii Remote Plus controller, which allows Wii Remote movement to be detected with greater accuracy. Twelve minigames are available to play with both single-player and multiplayer modes.
Unlike its predecessor, Wii Play: Motion features several minigames that can be played with up to four players.

Games
There are 12 minigames in WIi Play: Motion. The game starts with eight of the twelve being locked and are only accessible after playing the previous minigame.

Each developer's minigames are listed in the credits.

DevelopmentWii Play: Motion was announced by Nintendo's official press on April 12, 2011. It was also shown at the E3 convention that same year. Page 2. IGN. Retrieved 2011-07-27. The game's development resulted from the combined efforts of several game developers, including Good-Feel and Chunsoft, who were asked by Nintendo to create prototypes of games that utilized the Wii MotionPlus accessory. According to an interview on Iwata Asks, Ryusuke Niitani said he wanted to make a game himself if he ever had a chance to, so he created Teeter Targets. According to Cubed3, a total of around 200 staff members (including debug staff) were involved in the creation of Wii Play: Motion.

ReceptionWii Play: Motion received mixed reviews from critics, receiving an aggregate score of 61.89% on GameRankings as of March 2014. In Joey Davidson's review for Crave Online, Joey said that the controller of the game was "nice", The mini-games were "decent", and the bundle was decent. Nintendo Power rated the game 7.5 out of 10, stating that "although a few activities aren't exactly winners, the majority are fun and guaranteed to familiarize new users with the bundled Wii Remote Plus controller."

In contrast, GamePro's Andrew Hayward gave the game two stars. Hayward said that the game "does spotlight a better set of diversions than the original release, but little here will wow or surprise players who have been through the existing gauntlet of Wii mini-game packages." GameSpot reviewer Nathan Meunier awarded the game a 5.5/10, stating that "Greater variety and depth don't save this second round of motion minigames from the bargain bin." IGN's Jack DeVries gave the game a "bad" rating of 4/10, stating that "Even if you need a controller, I still can't recommend this."

By July 2012, Wii Play: Motion'' had sold 1.12 million copies.

Notes

References

External links
Official Website 

2011 video games
CAProduction games
Nintendo games
Nintendo Entertainment Analysis and Development games
Good-Feel games
Party video games
Video games developed in Japan
Wii-only games
Wii MotionPlus games
Wii games
Multiplayer and single-player video games
Video game sequels
Video games about size change
Chunsoft games
Skip Ltd. games
Vanpool games
Mitchell Corporation games
Video games scored by Daisuke Matsuoka
Arzest games
NDcube games